Iván Edgardo López Cano (born 5 October 1990) is a Honduran footballer who plays as a midfielder for F.C. Motagua and the Honduras national team.

Club career
López had a youth stint with Platense Junior, before playing at senior level in tier two for Villanueva and Yoro. He began featuring for Parrillas One in Liga Nacional from the 2014–15 campaign. He scored on his debut for the club, netting a late goal in a 3–2 defeat away to Real España on 1 August 2014. He followed that with fifteen further goals that season, including a brace over Victoria in September. Midway through the next campaign, in January 2016, López completed a move to top-flight side Real España. He scored twenty-one times in one hundred appearances across three seasons, with Real España winning the 2017–18 Apertura in the process.

International career
In June 2018, López was called up by the Honduras national team. He subsequently won two caps for his country, coming off the substitutes bench in friendly matches with South Korea and El Salvador. López made the preliminary squad for the 2019 CONCACAF Gold Cup, though was cut from the final squad.

Career statistics

Club
.

International

Honours
Real España
Liga Nacional: 2017–18 Apertura

References

External links

1990 births
Living people
People from San Pedro Sula
Honduran footballers
Honduras international footballers
Association football midfielders
Honduran Liga Nacional de Ascenso players
Liga Nacional de Fútbol Profesional de Honduras players
Villanueva F.C. players
Yoro F.C. players
Parrillas One players
Real C.D. España players
F.C. Motagua players